Viborg may refer to:

Places
Viborg, Denmark, a city in Jutland, Denmark
Viborg Municipality, a Danish municipality named for the city
Viborg County, a former county of Denmark
Diocese of Viborg
Viborg FF, a professional football team based in Viborg
Viborg HK, a handball club
Viborg Stadium, home of Viborg FF
Vyborg, Viipuri or Viborg, a city on the Karelian Isthmus, Leningrad Region, Russia
 Viborg Province, a former province of Finland
 Vyborg Castle
Viborg, South Dakota, a city in South Dakota, US

People
 Erik Viborg, veterinarian and botanist

See also

Vyborg (disambiguation)